The Scottish cricket team toured the United Arab Emirates to play the United Arab Emirates in February 2016. The tour consisted of a Twenty20 International (T20I) match. The match was in preparation for the World Twenty20 in India in March and was played at the ICC Academy in Dubai. The United Arab Emirates won the one-off match by 9 runs.

Squads

T20I series

Only T20I

See also
 Scottish cricket team against the Netherlands in the UAE in 2015–16

References

External links
 Series home at ESPN Cricinfo

2016 in Emirati cricket
2016 in Scottish cricket
International cricket competitions in 2015–16
2015-16
Scotland 2015